Shmuel Rozovsky (1913–1979) was a rabbi and a Talmudic lecturer at the Ponevezh Yeshiva in Bnei Brak, Israel.

Early life 

Rozovsky was born in Grodno, where his father Michel Dovid Rozovsky was the chief rabbi. His mother Sara Pearl was the daughter of Avraham Gelburd, the previous rabbi of Grodno. He studied at the local Sha’ar Hatorah Yeshiva and was student of Shimon Shkop. He also studied with Yisroel Zev Gustman.

In 1935, after the death of his father, to escape being drafted into the Soviet Red Army Rozovsky fled to British-ruled Palestine, where he studied in the Lomzha Yeshivah in Petach Tikvah, married the daughter of Tzvi Pesach Frank (Chief Rabbi of Jerusalem) and taught in the Lomzha Yeshiva.

Ponevezh Yeshiva 
In 1944, he became rosh yeshiva of the newly opened Ponovezh Yeshivah in Bnei Barak.

Rozovsky had a strong emphasis on Talmudic skills, and also stressed personal perfection and Mussar as well as the need to study other facets of Torah including Chumash with the commentaries of Rashi and Nachmanides.

Students
 Gershon Edelstein of Ponevezh yeshiva (Bnei Brak)

 Asher Arieli of Yeshivas Mir

 Aharon Pfeuffer, Rosh Yeshiva in London and Johannesburg, and authority on kashrut

Works
 Chiddushei Rabbi Shmuel
 Shiurei Rabbi Shmuel
 Zichron Shmuel

References

1913 births
1979 deaths
Haredi rabbis in Israel
Haredi rosh yeshivas
People from Grodno
Haredi rabbis in Mandatory Palestine
Ponevezh Yeshiva
Rabbis in Bnei Brak
Rabbis from Grodno